Šijan is a Serbian and Croatian surname. It may refer to:

Slobodan Šijan (born 1946), Serbian film director
Zoran Šijan (1964–1999), Serbian mobster (Surčin Clan) and kick-boxer
Lance Sijan or Lazar Šijan (1942–1968), American fighter pilot
Dane Šijan (born 1977), Serbian handball goalkeeper

See also
Šijak

Serbian surnames